Defending champions Mall Molesworth and Emily Hood Westacott defeated Joan Hartigan and Ula Valkenburg 6–8, 6–4, 6–4 in the final, to win the women's doubles tennis title at the 1934 Australian Championships.

Twenty three teams have entered for the event in which number of pairs was limited to sixteen. Twelve pairs were placed in the main draw and eleven had to play in the preliminary rounds, from which the last four qualified into the first round of the competition proper.

Seeds

  Mall Molesworth /  Emily Hood Westacott (champions)
  Louie Bickerton /  Nell Hall (semifinals)
  Joan Hartigan /  Ula Valkenburg (final)
  Nancy Chitty /  Nancy Lewis (semifinals)

Draw

Draw

References

External links
  Source for seedings
  Source for the draw

1934 in women's tennis
1934 in Australian women's sport
1934 in Australian tennis
Women's Doubles